Events from the year 1902 in Denmark.

Incumbents
 Monarch – Christian IX
 Prime minister – Johan Henrik Deuntzer

Events

 16 January – The underground toilets at Amagertorv in Copenhagen opens.
 12 May – The first telegram sent by wireless telegraphy is received in Copenhagen.
 18 July – The public sea bath at Kalvebod Brygge in Copenhagen is inaugurated.
 9 September – Statens Serum Institut is inaugurated.
 19 September – A Landsting election is held with the exception that the Faroese candidate was elected on 6 August.

Undated
 First road regulations in Copenhagen are introduced: The maximum speed allowed is 11.5 km/h, 7.5 km/h in dense traffic.

Culture

Music
 Carl Nielsen's opera Saul og David premieres at the Royal Danish Theatre.

Sports
 22 June  Thorvald Ellegaard wins gold in men's sprint at the 1902 UCI Track Cycling World Championships.

Births
 11 February – Arne Jacobsen, architect, designer (died 1971)
 23 October – Ib Schønberg, actor (died 1955 )

Deaths
 24 February – Valdemar Koch, architect (born 1852)
 7 March – Ida Marie Bille, court member (born 1822)
 11 April – Johan Daniel Herholdt, architect (born 1818)
 5 December – Carl Simonsen, printmaker (died 1828)

References

External links

 
Denmark
Years of the 20th century in Denmark
1900s in Denmark
Denmark